Gordon Charles Cree BMus FGMS (born 14 July 1977, Ayrshire) is a Scottish singer, actor, musician and entertainer.

Early life and education 
Gordon Cree was born and brought up in a working class home in Ayrshire, Scotland, UK.  After being educated at local primary and secondary schools, and at the unusually young age of 16, he was admitted as an undergraduate student at the Royal Scottish Academy of Music and Drama in Glasgow where he graduated Bachelor of Music in 1998, aged 20. Following his formal education he studied piano and musical direction with Peggy O'Keefe, orchestral scoring and arranging with Brian Fahey and organ with Professor George McPhee at Paisley Abbey.

Career 

He has earned his living exclusively from music for his whole adult life, and has performed at a very high professional level as a singer, pianist, organist, arranger, orchestrator, composer, conductor and light entertainer.

He was the musical director for many seasons at the famous Gaiety Theatre, Ayr and has been personal accompanist and musical director to several well-known artistes, most prolifically Moira Anderson and Anita Harris.  He worked for a time in the USA with legendary opera star, Marilyn Horne and has played prolifically for touring operas.

He was, for some years, a popular fixture - both alone and with his trio - at Gleneagles Hotel for Sunday lunch, special functions and during the festive season.

He has been a regular conductor for the Scottish concerts mounted by Raymond Gubbay International.

He is currently the organist and director of music of St. Andrew's West Parish Church (formerly Renfield St. Stephens), which is one of the largest and most imposing churches in Glasgow's City Centre, almost directly opposite his old stomping ground at the King's Theatre.

Composer
Cree has published many works, most of them short and very light in nature.

Selected Orchestral Works
 Capri Suite
 Angela (tribute to Angela Morley)
 Concertino (for organ and string orchestra)
 Champagne Flutes
 Fiddlers Free
 Havanaise (for violin and orchestra)
 Petite Marche Cérémoniale
 Suite for Strings
 Nocturne (for cello and orchestra)
 The Bognor Bugler's Return (for trumpet and orchestra)
 The Bognor Bugler's Farewell (for trumpet and orchestra)
 Shades of Heather (for tuned percussion and orchestra)

Solo Organ Works
 Prelude
 Meditation
 Aria
 Trumpet Tune
 Toccata on Adeste Fideles

Popular Music
 Scotland, My Song Forever (song)

Personal life 
He has been in a relationship with operatic and concert mezzo-soprano, Cheryl Forbes, since 2007.  They have been married since 2012.

Charity work 
He is well known for his support of various charity through his performance and endorsement.

It was announced in August 2013 that Cree and Forbes would be stepping down as sole executives for the Ayrshire (East) Foodbank due to family and work commitments, but stated that it was their dear hope that others would come forward to continue the work of the charity. The charity resumed under new management in October of the same year.

He is also the co-founder and organiser of a large-scale annual musical event which has raised tens of thousands of pounds for Scottish charities, including the Ayrshire Hospice, C.H.A.S., Combat Stress, Sight-Savers, Erskine Hospital and Food for Africa.

A freemason, he is a member of Chelsea Lodge No. 3098, the membership of which is made up of entertainers, and into which he was initiated at Freemasons' Hall, Great Queen Street, London.

References

External links 
Official Website

1977 births
Alumni of the Royal Conservatoire of Scotland
Living people
People from Irvine, North Ayrshire
Scottish classical composers
British male classical composers
Scottish classical pianists
Male classical pianists
Scottish conductors (music)
British male conductors (music)
21st-century Scottish male singers
British male pianists
21st-century British conductors (music)
21st-century classical pianists